Vladimir Ivanovich Kazakov (22 June 1950 - 8 April 2001) was a Russian professional football player.

External links
 

1950 births
2001 deaths
Soviet footballers
Association football midfielders
Association football forwards
FC Spartak Moscow players
FC Kuban Krasnodar players
FC CSKA Kyiv players
FC Chernomorets Novorossiysk players
People from Yeysk
Sportspeople from Krasnodar Krai